"King of My City" is a song by American rapper A Boogie wit da Hoodie. It was released on January 31, 2020 as the third single from his third studio album Artist 2.0 (2020), with an accompanying music video. The song was produced by Boi-1da, S. Dot, JoeFromYO and DLo Beatz.

Background
On January 29, 2020, A Boogie wit da Hoodie teased the song on Instagram and released it two days later. Rapper Lil Uzi Vert was originally featured on the song.

Composition
On the track A Boogie sings about his neighborhood, Highbridge, Bronx, and his crew, and how they are not to be messed with.

Music video
The music video was released on January 31, 2020, and sets the scene for Highbridge. A Boogie is on the streets among a group of "Joker lookalikes", and vandalizes cars, dines luxuriously and pops champagne bottles.

Charts

Certifications

References

2020 singles
2020 songs
A Boogie wit da Hoodie songs
Songs written by A Boogie wit da Hoodie
Song recordings produced by Boi-1da
Songs written by Boi-1da
Atlantic Records singles